Bezubaan Ishq is 2015 Hindi romantic film directed by Jashwant Gangani and produced by C.J. Gadara and Dinesh Likhiya. The film stars Mugdha Godse, Sneha Ullal and Nishant malkani in leads roles. Music directors Babli Haque and Rupesh Verma composed the music for the film. The film was released on July 3, 2015.

Plot

The film is set in the modern milieu with traditional Indian backdrop and values. It revolves around three friends and their respective families. Mansukh Patel is an NRI business tycoon residing with his British wife, Lisa and daughter Rumzum in London, UK. The Patels live in the United Kingdom but haven't forgotten their Indian tradition and values.

Mansukh's younger brother, Rashmikant lives in Mumbai with his daughter, Suhani. Having lost his wife Rekha early in life, Rashmikant is a protective father and pampers Suhani with all her demands, and so does his mother, Savitri.

Rashmikant's childhood friend, Vipul is also his business partner. He lives with his wife, Laxmi and son, Swagat. Suhani and Swagat have been childhood sweethearts. Suhani is a bindaas, open-hearted girl. Swagat is more subdued in nature. Swagat plays an important role in Suhani's life.

Swagat is bowled over by Rumzum's simplicity, pure innocence, beauty and her nature. Whereas, Suhani is madly in love with Swagat. Will Swagat marry Suhani and live happily ever after or will he find true love in Rumzum? Jashwant Gangani's Bezubaan Ishq unravels the beautiful story of unspoken love and sacrifice with pure characters from real life.

Casting

Mugdha Godse's character, 'Suhani' is an electrifying personality. She is full of life, a spoilt brat, and can be very aggressive when it comes to love and friendship. She loves her friend a lot.

Introducing Nishant malkani as a young boy, playing the role of 'Swagat'. His modern views with traditional values is what will blow your mind. In the film, he is shown as the son of a business tycoon and Suhani's best friend.

Sneha Ullal, plays the role of 'Rumzum', a kind-hearted and innocent girl, who is also 'Suhani's' cousin from London.

Cast

Mugdha Godse as Suhani
Sneha Ullal as Rumzum
Nishant Singh Malkani as Swagat 
Darshan Jariwala as Rashmikant Patel
Farida Jalal as Savitri
Sachin Khedekar as Manshuk Patel
Muni Jha as Vipul Shah
Smita Jaykar as Laxmi Shah 
Alexandra Ashman as Liza
Jitu Pandya
Soniya Mehta as Ananya
Rittesh Mobh as Pintu
Akshita Sethi as Jassi
Aru Krishansh Verma as Parbat
Devendra Pandit 
Sanjay Patel
Rakesh Pujara
Abhijeet
Ajay Sharma
Hitesh Rawal
Naresh Patel
Yasmine Deliken
Dr. Rahul Sharma
Gautam Shrivastav
Saloni

Soundtrack

The music for the film is composed by Rupesh Verma & Babli Haque. The soundtrack of the film comprises 7 songs & lyrics are penned by Jashwant Gangani & Prashant Ingole (Har Lamha Kar Party) and the Audio CD was released by Sony Music India.

Critical reception

Troy Ribeiro of NDTV gave the film a rating of 0.5 out of 5 and said that, "Bezubaan Ishq lacks novelty and offers nothing spectacular. The plot, stitched with numerous songs, seems forced and the situations contrived." Paloma Sharma of Rediff gave the film a rating of 0.5 out of 5 and said that, "Bezubaan Ishq is pure drivel." Renuka Vyavahare of The Times of India criticized the film makers for making a film on a story that is way past its expiry date and said that, "Their concept is ghastly outdated and the television soap opera-esque execution yawn-worthy." The critic gave the film a rating of 1.5 out of 5.

References

External links 
 

Indian romantic drama films
Indian family films
2010s Hindi-language films
Films shot in Mumbai
2015 romantic drama films